Mark Feldman (born 1955 in Chicago) is an American jazz violinist.

Biography
Feldman worked in Chicago from 1973–1980, in Nashville, Tennessee from 1980–1986, in New York City and Western Europe from 1986. He has performed with John Zorn, John Abercrombie, The Masada String Trio, Dave Douglas, Uri Caine, and Billy Hart.

He was a member of the Civic Orchestra of Chicago and played in many bar bands in Chicago. He played on over 200 recordings in Nashville as a studio musician, was a member of the Nashville Symphony, and was a member of the touring groups of country western entertainers Loretta Lynn and Ray Price.

In 2003, he was soloist with Netherlands Radio Philharmonic Orchestra in Guus Janssen's Violin Concerto and with the WDR Jazz Orchestra in Concerto for Violin and Jazz Orchestra by Bill Dobbins. At New York's Lincoln Center he performed in duo with pianists Paul Bley and Muhal Richard Abrams.

He has recorded with Michael Brecker, Lee Konitz, Joe Lovano, and Chris Potter and has played on over 100 recordings in New York City as a soloist in contemporary music and modern jazz.

Feldman has released several albums, including Music for Violin Alone (Tzadik, 1995); Book of Tells (Enja, 2000); What Exit (ECM, 2006 with British pianist John Taylor; To Fly to Steal (Intakt, 2010) with bassist Thomas Morgan and drummer Gerry Hemingway; and Oblivia (Tzadik, 2010) with his wife, Swiss pianist Sylvie Courvoisier.

Discography

As leader/co-leader
 Music for Violin Alone (Tzadik, 1995)
 Music for Violin and Piano (Avant, 1999)
 Book of Tells (Enja, 2005)
 What Exit (ECM, 2006)
 Secrets (Tzadik, 2009) with Uri Caine, Greg Cohen, Joey Baron
 To Fly to Steal Sylvie Courvoisier-Mark Feldman Quartet with Thomas Morgan and Gerry Hemingway(Intakt 2010)
 Oblivia with Sylvie Courvoisier (Tzadik, 2010)
 Hôtel du Nord Sylvie Courvoisier-Mark Feldman Quartet with Thomas Morgan and Gerry Hemingway(Intakt, 2011)
 Live at Theatre Vidy–Lausanne – Sylvie Courvoisier–Mark Feldman Duo (Intakt, 2013) 
 Birdies for Lulu–Sylvie Courvoisier–Mark Feldman Quartet with Scott Colley and Billy Mintz (Intakt, 2014)
 Miller's Tale–Sylvie Courvoisier–Mark Feldman - Evan Parker-  Ikue Mori (Intakt, 2016)

With the Arcado String Trio
 Arcado (album) (JMT, 1989)
 Behind the Myth (JMT, 1990)
 For Three Strings and Orchestra (JMT, 1992) with Kölner Rundfunk Orchester conducted by David de Villiers
 Green Dolphy Suite (Enja, 1995) with Trio De Clarinettes
 Live in Europe (Avant, 1996)

As sideman
With John Abercrombie
 Open Land (ECM, 1998)
 Cat 'n' Mouse (ECM, 2000)
 Class Trip (ECM, 2003)
 The Third Quartet (ECM, 2006)
 Wait Till You See Her (ECM, 2008)

With Muhal Richard Abrams
 One Line, Two Views (New World, 1995)
 The Visibility of Thought (Mutable, 2001)
With Ray Anderson
Big Band Record (Gramavision, 1994) with the George Gruntz Concert Jazz Band
With Tim Berne
 Tim Berne's Fractured Fairy Tales (JMT, 1989)
With Don Byron
Don Byron Plays the Music of Mickey Katz (Nonesuch, 1993)
With Uri Caine
 Urlicht / Primal Light (Winter & Winter, 1997)
 Wagner e Venezia (Winter & Winter, 1997)
 The Sidewalks of New York: Tin Pan Alley (Winter & Winter, 1999)
 Gustav Mahler in Toblach (Winter & Winter, 1999)
 Gustav Mahler: Dark Flame (Winter & Winter, 2003)

With The Chromatic Persuaders
 The Chromatic Persuaders (Konnex, 1994)
 Extrospection (Timescraper, 1998)

With Sylvie Courvoisier
 Abaton (ECM, 2003)

With Marilyn Crispell
 Santuerio (Leo, 1993)

With Dave Douglas
 Parallel Worlds (Soul Note, 1993)
 Five (Soul Note, 1996)
 Charms of the Night Sky (Winter & Winter, 1998)
 Convergence (Soul Note, 1999)
 A Thousand Evenings (RCA, 2000)
 El Trilogy (BMG, 2001)
 Witness (RCA, 2001

With Yelena Eckemoff
 Leaving Everything Behind (L & H, 2016)

With Billy Hart
 Amethyst (Arabesque, 1993)
 Oceans of Time (Arabesque, 1997)

With One Ring Zero
 Planets (Urban Geek, 2010)

With Marc Ribot
 Soundtracks Volume 2 (Tzadik, 2003)
With Dave Soldier
 Mark Twain's War Prayer / Ultraviolet Railroad (Newport Classics, 1996)
 The Kropotkins (Koch Records, 1996)
With They Might Be Giants
 Flood (Skyline, 1990)
With Tom Varner
 The Mystery of Compassion (Soul Note, 1992)
With Jarek Śmietana
 Jarek Śmietana Band – A Tribute To Zbigniew Seifert (featuring Jerry Goodman, Didier Lockwood, Krzesimir Dębski, Christian Howes, Maciej Strzelczyk, Adam Bałdych, Pierre Blanchard, Mateusz Smoczyński: JSR Records – JSR 0011, 2009)With John Zorn' Kristallnacht (Eva, 1993)
 Bar Kokhba (Tzadik, 1996)
 Filmworks VI: 1996 (Tzadik, 1997)
 Duras: Duchamp (Tzadik, 1997)
 The Circle Maker (Tzadik, 1998)
 Filmworks VIII: 1997 (Tzadik, 1998)
 The String Quartets (Tzadik, 1999)
 Taboo & Exile (Tzadik, 1999)
 Filmworks XI: Secret Lives (Tzadik, 2002)
 Cobra: John Zorn's Game Pieces Volume 2 (Tzadik, 2002)
 Filmworks XII: Three Documentaries (Tzadik, 2002)
 Masada Recital (Tzadik, 2004) with Sylvie Courvoisier
 Filmworks XVIII: The Treatment (Tzadik, 2006)
 50th Birthday Celebration Volume 1 (Tzadik, 2004) with Masada String Trio
 50th Birthday Celebration Volume 11 (Tzadik, 2005) with Bar Kokhba Sextet
 Azazel: Book of Angels Volume 2 (Tzadik, 2005) with Masada String Trio
 Malphas: Book of Angels Volume 3 (Tzadik, 2005) with Sylvie Courvoisier
 Lucifer: Book of Angels Volume 10 (Tzadik, 2008) with Bar Kokhba Sextet
 Filmworks XX: Sholem Aleichem (Tzadik, 2008)
 Haborym: Book of Angels Volume 16 (Tzadik, 2010) with Masada String Trio
 The Concealed'' (Tzadik, 2012)

External links 
 Official website
 All About Jazz
 [ allmusic.com biography]

1955 births
Living people
Chamber jazz musicians
American jazz violinists
American male violinists
CIMP artists
Avant-garde jazz violinists
Alessa Records artists
21st-century American violinists
21st-century American male musicians
American male jazz musicians
Arcado String Trio members